Allathelges is a genus of Isopoda parasites, in the family Bopyridae, containing the following species:

Allathelges alisonae Williams & Boyko, 2016
Allathelges pakistanensis Kazmi & Markham, 1999

References 

Isopod genera
Cymothoida